The canton of Laon-2 is an administrative division of the Aisne department, in northern France. It was created at the French canton reorganisation which came into effect in March 2015. Its seat is in Laon.

It consists of the following communes: 
 
Arrancy 
Athies-sous-Laon
Bièvres
Bruyères-et-Montbérault
Cerny-en-Laonnois
Chamouille
Chérêt
Chivy-lès-Étouvelles
Colligis-Crandelain
Eppes
Étouvelles
Festieux
Laon (partly)
Laval-en-Laonnois
Lierval 
Martigny-Courpierre
Montchâlons
Monthenault
Nouvion-le-Vineux
Orgeval
Parfondru
Presles-et-Thierny
Samoussy
Veslud
Vorges

References

Cantons of Aisne